Ali Fadavi is an Iranian military officer who currently holds office as the second highest commander in the Islamic Revolutionary Guard Corps hierarchy.

Early life and education 
He was born in 1961. Fadavi studied at Isfahan University of Technology, where he gained a B.Sc. in electrical engineering and a MS in strategic management.

Military career 
Fadavi joined the IRGC in 1983 and is a veteran of Iran–Iraq War. He served in the Quds Force, and have held "sensitive intelligence" positions. He saw combat during the Iran-Iraq war. His career includes intelligence assignments as the Chief of Intelligence for the Najaf, Nooh, and Hamzeh Seyyed Ol-Shohada Headquarters respectively, Chief of Intelligence for the IRGCN, and Chief of Intelligence for Khatemolanbia HQ. Fadavi also served as the IRGCN 1st Naval District Commander. From 1997 to 2010, he was deputy commander of the IRGC Naval forces and later commanded the branch from May 2010 to 23 August 2018. On 23 August 2018 he was appointed to the position of IRGC coordinator deputy, replacing Jamaladin Aberoumand.

Awards 
In February 2016, Fadavi along with other commanders of the Islamic Revolutionary Guard Corps received Fath medal for arresting United States Navy sailors on January 12, 2016 in the Persian Gulf.

References 

 Adam Kredo. "Iran vows to destroy the U.S. Navy". The Washington Times. 2014–10–10. Retrieved 2015–11–29.
 Dareini, Ali Akbar. "Iran admiral: US ships are a target in case of war". Yahoo News. 2014–05–06. Retrieved 2015–11–29.
 

Islamic Revolutionary Guard Corps brigadier generals
Recipients of the Order of Fath
Iranian commodores
1961 births
Living people
Islamic Revolutionary Guard Corps personnel of the Iran–Iraq War
Quds Force personnel